Fritillaria karelinii is an Asian species of herbaceous perennial plant in the lily family Liliaceae, native to Kazakhstan, Kyrgyzstan, Tajikistan, Uzbekistan, Turkmenistan, Iran, Pakistan, and Xinjiang.

Flowers of the wild populations are rose-violet with darker markings; flowers of cultivars  may be different.

formerly included
Fritillaria karelinii f. gibbosa (Boiss.) Bornm., now called  	Fritillaria gibbosa Boiss.

References

External links

Pacific Bulb Society, Asian Fritillaria Two photos of several species including Fritillaria karelinii
Edgewood Gardens

karelinii
Flora of Asia
Plants described in 1835
Taxa named by Friedrich Ernst Ludwig von Fischer
Taxa named by David Don
Taxa named by John Gilbert Baker